Agustín Acosta Bentancourt (born 17 February 2001) is a Uruguayan professional footballer who plays for Rentistas. Primarily a left-back, he can also play as a left midfielder.

Career
Acosta is a youth academy graduate of Rentistas. He made his professional debut for the club on 18 October 2020 in a 1–2 league defeat against Liverpool Montevideo.

Acosta is a Uruguayan youth international. He is currently a member of Uruguay under-20 team.

Career statistics

References

External links
 

2001 births
Living people
Footballers from Montevideo
Association football midfielders
Uruguayan footballers
Uruguayan Primera División players
C.A. Rentistas players